SS Northern Star was an ocean liner completed in 1962 for the United Kingdom-based Shaw, Savill & Albion Line's tourist class round the world service via South Africa and Australia. She was essentially an enlarged version of the SS Southern Cross, built seven years earlier. Northern Star sailed out via the Cape and home via Panama, while her fleet mate sailed out via Panama and home via the Cape.

History
From the early 1970s she spent most of her time cruising, but was continually beset with mechanical problems due to inadequate maintenance. With the great increase in oil prices in 1973/4 she became uneconomic and would have required an expensive and time-consuming refit to make up for the deferred maintenance and so was withdrawn from service at the end of her 1975 summer cruise programme. In spite of being only twelve years old her poor mechanical condition made her unattractive to other operators and she was sold for scrapping. On 11 December 1975 she arrived at Kaohsiung to be broken up by Li Chong Steel and Iron Works.

References

Ocean liners
1961 ships
Ships of the Shaw, Savill & Albion Line